Digard is a surname. Notable people with the surname include:

 Didier Digard (born 1986), French footballer
 Uschi Digard (born 1948), Swedish former softcore porn star and model

See also
 DiGard Motorsports, a championship-winning race team in NASCAR Winston Cup